The men's 800 metre freestyle competition at the 2014 Pan Pacific Swimming Championships took place on August 24 at the Gold Coast Aquatic Centre. The last champion was Ryan Cochrane of Canada.

This event was a timed-final where each swimmer swam just once. The top 8 seeded swimmers swam in the evening and the remaining swimmers swam in the morning session.

Records
Prior to this competition, the existing world and Pan Pacific records were as follows:

Results
All times are in minutes and seconds.

The first and final round were held on August 24, at 19:16.

References

2014 Pan Pacific Swimming Championships